Quitman County is the name of two counties in the United States:
 Quitman County, Georgia
 Quitman County, Mississippi